Sodium lauroamphoacetate is a zwitterionic surfactant of the amphoacetate class. It is used as a very mild cleaning agent originally used in shampoos and body washes for infants but it now sees broader use in other personal care products.

Synthesis
Sodium lauroamphoacetate is produced in a 2 step process. Firstly lauric acid reacts with aminoethylethanolamine (AEEA); this initially produces the amide however heating causes this to cyclize to give the imidazoline group. This reacts with 1 equivalent of sodium chloroacetate to give the final product. A reaction with 2 equivalents gives the di-acetate, which is also marketed as di-sodium lauroamphoacetate.

Safety
Sodium lauroamphoacetate is exceedingly mild, and cases of skin irritation are rare but not unheard of. It has been proposed that these instances are caused not by sodium lauroamphoacetate itself but rather by failures in quality control which result in it being contaminated with AEEA.

References

Zwitterionic surfactants
Cosmetics chemicals
Organic sodium salts